This is a list of all the United States Supreme Court cases from volume 517 of the United States Reports:

External links

1996 in United States case law